Control cab may refer to:
 Cab (locomotive) 
 Control car